Claire Harris may refer to:

 Claire Harris (poet) (1937–2018), Canadian poet
 Claire Harris (artist), New Zealand photographer
 Claire Williams (born 1976; married name Harris), Formula One team leader

See also
 Clara Harris, American socialite
 Clare Harris (disambiguation)